The National Spatial Strategy 2002-2020 is a twenty-year planning framework, with an aim of balancing social, economic and physical development in the Republic of Ireland.

Gateways and hubs
The strategy seeks both to prevent the Greater Dublin Area becoming an area of problematic urban sprawl, and also to prevent rural areas becoming fragmented with scattered one-off housing. It seeks to do this by identifying various urban centres outside Dublin as focus points for concentrated development, drawing this away from both Dublin and the rural areas. The report describes two tiers of regional centres: a few larger "Gateways" with smaller "Hubs" as more local foci.  When the NSS was being developed, William Thomas proposed a brand new city in the west of the country, gaining some news coverage.

There was controversy over the selection of the gateways and hubs, with towns not selected feeling aggrieved. A notable concept was the "Midland Gateway" comprising three of the larger towns in the midlands. The intention was a polycentric model with some inspiration from the Triangle Region Denmark. The inclusion in the plan of Derry, which is across the border in Northern Ireland, was a reflection of improved cross-border co-operation in the wake of the Northern Ireland peace process.

Gateways
 Cork
 Limerick—Shannon
 Galway
 Sligo
 Letterkenny—Derry
 Dundalk
 Dublin
 Tullamore—Athlone—Mullingar
 Waterford

Hubs
 Tralee and Killarney
 Mallow
 Ennis
 Tuam
 Castlebar and Ballina
 Monaghan
 Cavan
 Kilkenny
 Wexford

References

External links
 Irish Spatial Strategy website

Economy of the Republic of Ireland
2000s in Ireland
2010s in Ireland